Olindia is a genus of moths belonging to the family Tortricidae.

Species
Olindia schumacherana Fabricius, 1787

References

 , 2005: World Catalogue of Insects volume 5 Tortricidae.

External links
tortricidae.com

Polyorthini
Tortricidae genera
Taxa named by Achille Guenée